Peter Tagg may refer to:

 Peter Law (actor)'s birth name
 Peter Tagg (musician), in Cardiacs and The Trudy
Peter Tagg, manager of Hampton & Richmond Borough F.C.